Thekua (also spelt as Thokwa or Thekariis), also known as Khajuria, Tikari and Thokni, is a cookie from the Indian subcontinent, popular in the Indian states of Bihar and Uttar Pradesh and Terai region of Nepal. Thekua is a revered prasada, offering to god, during Chhath puja. It has been used as a sweet snack for centuries in these places.

Preparation 
The main ingredients of thekua are wheat flour, chasni (melted sugar) and ghee. Jaggery can sometimes be used as an alternative to sugar.Dough is prepared using these four main ingredients and cardamom can be added to enhance the taste. A special wooden cookie mold is used to form various designs on the thekua. Dough is deep fried in ghee or vegetable oil until it becomes reddish brown. It is soft when hot but hardens after it cools. It needs no preservatives and it can be preserved for several days for eating.

The preparation of thekua for the Chhath celebration is usually done in the worshipping room, to maintain the purity.

Record
A group of 16 people from Darbhanga, Bihar prepared a Thekuwa of 91kg in 2019 to catch the attention of the Limca Book of Records.

References

External links

Cookies
Indian desserts
Bihari cuisine
Nepalese cuisine